Roblox Corporation is an American video game developer based in San Mateo, California. Founded in 2004 by David Baszucki and Erik Cassel, the company is the developer of Roblox, which was released in 2006. , the company employs over 2,100 people.

History 

Roblox Corporation was founded by David Baszucki and Erik Cassel. Baszucki had previously founded Knowledge Revolution, an educational software company, in 1989. That year, through the company, he and Cassel developed Interactive Physics, a 2D physics simulation. Knowledge Revolution followed this up with Working Model, which simulated mechanical devices. Baszucki was the company's vice president and general manager from 2000 until 2002, when he left MSC Software to establish Baszucki & Associates, an angel investment firm. He and Cassel founded Roblox Corporation in 2004. Working from an office in Menlo Park, California, they began preliminary work on the video game DynaBlocks, which was launched in a beta state later that year. The game's name was changed to Roblox in 2005, and the game was formally released on September 1, 2006.

Cassel died from cancer on February 11, 2013. In December 2013, Roblox Corporation had 68 employees, which it raised to 163 by December 2016. The company secured a  investment in March 2017 through a round of funding led by Meritech Capital Partners and Index Ventures. Eyeing international expansion, Roblox Corporation established Roblox International and hired Chris Misner as its president in May 2018. Under Misner, Roblox was launched in Chinese (in partnership with Tencent), German, and French in 2019. By September 2018, Roblox Corporation had hired Dan Williams (previously of Dropbox) to move Roblox from a third-party cloud computing service to a proprietary one. The company acquired PacketZoom, a developer of mobile networks optimization software, in October 2018. PacketZoom, including its employees and founder and chief technology officer Chetan Ahuja, was merged into Roblox Corporation.

By October 2020, Roblox Corporation had begun planning to become a public company, evaluating whether to perform a regular initial public offering (IPO) or using the less common method of a direct listing. Later that month, the company filed with the United States Securities and Exchange Commission (SEC) to prepare an IPO worth , looking to be listed on the New York Stock Exchange (NYSE) with the ticker symbol "RBLX". By this time, the company had more than 830 full-time employees and 1,700 "trust and safety agents". The company acquired Loom.ai, a company that creates 3D avatars from photographs, in December 2020. In January 2021, Roblox Corporation announced that it would pursue a direct listing instead of an IPO. The SEC had also requested that Roblox Corporation changes how it reports the sales of its virtual currency, Robux. The NYSE approved the direct listing of Roblox Corporation's class A shares by February 2021. The shares began trading on March 10 that year, with the initial buys giving the company an estimated  valuation. In August 2021, Roblox Corporation acquired the online communication platforms Bash Video and Guilded, paying  in cash and stock for the latter.

Reception

Accolades 
Roblox Corporation has been ranked on Pocket Gamer.bizs top lists of mobile game developers, placing sixth in 2018, eighth in 2019, and sixth in 2020. Fortune featured it as one of the best small and medium-sized workplaces in the San Francisco Bay Area, placing it sixteenth in 2019 and fortieth in 2021. In 2016 and 2017, Inc. ranked Roblox Corporation on its "Inc. 5000" list of fastest-growing privates companies in the United States. In 2020, Fast Company regarded it as the ninth-most innovative company in the world, as well as the most innovative in the gaming sector.

Criticism 

On August 19, 2021, YouTube channel People Make Games released the results of their investigation into the Roblox Corporation. In their video report, they allege the company exploits young video game developers by taking an outsized share (75.5%) of revenue made from games on their platform. In a discussion with Axios, Roblox chief product officer (CPO) Manuel Bronstein responded by saying that Roblox's intent is to give more money to its community developers.

After the report's publication, Roblox asked People Make Games to retract the video. Instead, they released a follow-up video report which further outlined several child safety issues they felt were present in Roblox.

Legal disputes 
In June 2016, Cinemark Theatres filed a lawsuit against Roblox Corporation over trademark infringement. The plaintiff cited several user-created games within Roblox that recreated Cinemark locations, including the trademarked branding.

In February 2018, YouTuber Kerstin Hoffmann, known as Keisyo, claimed that Roblox Corporation owed her  because the company had stopped her from converting her 42 million Robux balance into real-world money for no given reason. In response, Roblox Corporation stated that she could not transfer her Robux because she had earned them through "fraudulent activities".

In May 2021, an unnamed litigant filed a class-action lawsuit against Roblox Corporation, accusing the company of ripping off players with bogus purchases. Stating "The company's decision to sell first and 'moderate' later has obvious monetary benefit for Roblox, by the time defendant has deleted items from the Avatar Shop and users' inventories, it has already taken its 30% commission from the sale." Roblox Corporation said that they review all content submitted by developers through a multi-step review process before it appears on the platform.

The complaint states, "Roblox actively preys on its impressionable user base and their desire for popular music, teaching children that pirating music is perfectly acceptable." Roblox Corporation responded to the lawsuit by contending that they "do not tolerate copyright infringement" and expressing an intent to contest the lawsuit.
On September 27, 2021 Roblox and NMPA announced they had reached an agreement which "settles claims filed by NMPA members [and] offers an industry-wide opt-in open to all eligible NMPA publishers," settling the lawsuit.

In November 2021, Roblox Corporation filed a $1.65 million lawsuit against YouTuber Benjamin Robert Simon, also known online as Ruben Sim. The complaint states a breach of contract, "cyber-bullying and harassing Roblox employees and executives" and "posting false and misleading terrorist threats" during the Roblox Developer Conference 2021 which led to it being temporarily shut down. On January 16, 2022, the judgement was agreed upon both parties which requires Simon to pay $150,000 to Roblox Corporation. With the judgement, Simon is permanently banned from accessing Roblox due to it not creating a legal precedent for other users who may evade IP bans or violate a game's terms of service.

References

External links 
 

2004 establishments in California
American companies established in 2004
Companies based in San Mateo, California
Companies listed on the New York Stock Exchange
Direct stock offerings
 
Video game companies based in California
Video game companies established in 2004
Video game development companies